Gülağaç, formerly Ağaçlı, is a town in Aksaray Province in the Central Anatolia region of Turkey. It is the seat of Gülağaç District. Its population is 4,819 (2021).

References

External links
 District municipality's official website 
 Map of Gülağaç district
 

Towns in Turkey
Populated places in Aksaray Province
Gülağaç District